ZUUS Latino was an American digital broadcast television network that was owned by Zuus Media. The network specialized in broadcasting Spanish music videos; its playlist of videos extended from the 1990s through the present day. The network also aired occasional informercials in prime time and other high-dollar day parts. It operated from November 2013 to January 2016.

History

In 2013, Zuus Media had purchased The Country Network, renaming it ZUUS Country, and had plans to launch a number of ZUUS-branded music video channels of various formats; ZUUS Latino was the only other format to ever make it to air.

In January 2016, Zuus Media folded. ZUUS Country was sold off and reverted to its previous brand as The Country Network; ZUUS Latino was shut down.

Former affiliates
The following list is of all of the former affiliates that carried ZUUS Latino from its launch in November 2013, until its closure in January 2016.

References

External links
 
 ZUUS Latino live online

Music video networks in the United States
Television channels and stations established in 2009